Persatuan Sepakbola Kepahiang (simply known as PS Kepahiang) is an Indonesian football club based in Kepahiang Regency, Bengkulu. They currently compete in the Liga 3.

References

External links

Football clubs in Indonesia
Football clubs in Bengkulu
Association football clubs established in 2021
2021 establishments in Indonesia